Dashiwo Town is a town situated on the south side of Fangshan District, Beijing, China. It shares border with Hanghecun and Changgou Towns in its east, Dongxianpo Village in its south, and Zhangfang Town in its northwest. As of 2020, the town had a census population of 31,000.

History

Administrative Divisions 

In 2021, Dashiwo Town had 24 villages under its adminitration:

Landmark 
 Yunju Temple

Gallery

See also 
 List of township-level divisions of Beijing

References 

Fangshan District
Towns in Beijing